College Mound may refer to:

 College Mound, Missouri
 College Mound, Texas